Ignat Golovatsiuk  (born 5 May 1997) is a Belarusian speed skater who competes internationally.
 
He participated at the 2018 Winter Olympics.

References

External links

1997 births
Living people
Belarusian male speed skaters
Olympic speed skaters of Belarus
Speed skaters at the 2018 Winter Olympics
Speed skaters at the 2022 Winter Olympics
People from Babruysk
Sportspeople from Mogilev Region